Renée Hložek (born 15 November 1983) is a South African cosmologist, Professor of Astronomy & Astrophysics at the Dunlap Institute for Astronomy & Astrophysics at the University of Toronto, and an Azrieli Global Scholar within the Canadian Institute for Advanced Research. She studies the cosmic microwave background, Type Ia supernova and baryon acoustic oscillations. She is a Senior TED Fellow and was made a Sloan Research Fellow in 2020.

Early life and education 
Hložek studied Mathematics at the University of Pretoria and the University of Cape Town graduating in 2008. During her undergraduate studies she worked on dark energy. She completed her PhD at the University of Oxford as a Rhodes Scholar in 2011. Her thesis, "Probing the early universe and Dark Energy with multi-epoch cosmological data", used the Atacama Cosmology Telescope and Sloan Digital Sky Survey. Her doctoral advisor was Jo Dunkley. During her time at Oxford, she appeared on Chris Lintott's Pub Astronomy podcast and 365 Days of Astronomy.

Research and career 
After her PhD Hložek joined Princeton University as a Lyman Spitzer Jr. Postdoctoral Research Fellow. At Princeton University she prepared for the polarisation-sensitive Atacama Cosmology Telescope. In 2012 she was appointed a Spitzer-Cotsen Fellow at Princeton University. At Princeton she took part in a prison teaching initiative, and formed the Hope-Princeton exchange to bring young black women into Princeton's astronomy departments. She took part in the Story Collider. In 2013 she took part in the Science Train started by Lucianne Walkowicz at Princeton, where she took to the New York City Subway to talk to the public about astronomy.

She joined the Dunlap Institute for Astronomy & Astrophysics in 2016. She continues to work with the polarisation instrument on the Atacama Cosmology Telescope, alongside data from Planck and Wilkinson Microwave Anisotropy Probe and BICEP and Keck Array. She looks to classify radio transient signals using the Algonquin 46m radio telescope. She has worked with the Perimeter Institute for Theoretical Physics. In 2017 she took part in the Canadian Institute for Advanced Research Untangling the Cosmos event. In 2020 she was awarded a Sloan Research Fellow.

Hložek was named a TED Fellow in 2012 and a Senior Fellow in 2014. Her contribution to TEDed "The death of the universe" has been viewed 1.1 Million times. She has spoken at several TED events, including the 2014 TED conference in Vancouver. She takes part in several activities to improve gender balance in science.

References

External links 
The death of the universe - Renée Hlozek

1983 births
21st-century South African scientists
21st-century Canadian astronomers
TED Fellows
Cosmologists
Living people
Princeton University fellows
South African Rhodes Scholars
South African women scientists
University of Cape Town alumni
University of Pretoria alumni
Academic staff of the University of Toronto
LGBT scientists